Thomas Andrew Monheim is an American intelligence officer serving as the Inspector General of the United States Intelligence Community. He was confirmed by the Senate on September 30, 2021, to be the permanent Inspector General. He previously served as general counsel of the National Geospatial-Intelligence Agency.

Education 
Monheim is a graduate of the University of Pennsylvania, the UCLA School of Law, and National War College.

Career

Military service 
Monheim has served as a prosecutor, defense counsel, military judge, and deputy general counsel of the White House Military Office.

He was mobilized for nine months in support of Operation Enduring Freedom and again for nine months in support of Operation Iraqi Freedom.

Monheim retired as a colonel from the air Air Force Reserves.

U.S. intelligence community acting inspector general 
Monheim became acting inspector of the intelligence community on April 3, 2020, after President Donald Trump fired his predecessor, Michael Atkinson.

Biden administration
On April 27, 2021, President Joe Biden nominated Monheim to be the Inspector General of the National Intelligence office. Hearings were held before the Senate Intelligence Committee on July 20, 2021. On July 28, 2021, the committee favorably reported his nomination to the Senate floor; the Senate Homeland Security Committee subsequently did as well. Monheim was confirmed by the entire Senate on September 30, 2021, by voice vote.

References 

Living people
National Geospatial-Intelligence Agency leaders
National Geospatial-Intelligence Agency people
National War College alumni
University of California alumni
University of Pennsylvania alumni
Trump administration personnel
Biden administration personnel
Year of birth missing (living people)